Blende may refer to:

Substances 
 Sphalerite (Zinc blende, ZnS), the most common usage
 Hornblende, a complex inosilicate series of minerals
 Pitchblende, former name of uraninite

Places 
 Blende, Colorado
 Blende mine, lead and zinc mines in Canada
, watercourse in Canada

Other uses 
 an alternative name for Rana Niejta

See also 
 Blend (disambiguation)